Hopewell is an unincorporated community in DeKalb County, Alabama, United States.

Geography

References

Unincorporated communities in DeKalb County, Alabama
Unincorporated communities in Alabama